This is a list of the 81 judgments given by the Supreme Court of the United Kingdom in the year 2013. They are ordered by neutral citation.

The table lists judgments made by the court and the opinions of the judges in each case. Judges are treated as having concurred in another's judgment when they either formally attach themselves to the judgment of another or speak only to acknowledge their concurrence with one or more judges. Any judgment which reaches a conclusion that differs from the majority on one or more major points of the appeal has been treated as dissent.

All dates are for 2013 unless expressly stated otherwise.

Table key

2013 judgments

Notes

Judges
Lord Walker served until 17 March 2013. 
Lord Hope served until 26 June 2013. Lady Hale replaced him as Deputy President of the Supreme Court.
Lord Hughes became a justice on 9 April 2013. He replaced Lord Dyson who stepped down to become Master of the Rolls.
Lord Toulson became a justice on 9 April 2013. He replaced Lord Walker.
Lord Hodge became a justice on 1 October 2013. He replaced Lord Hope.

External links
 Supreme Court decided cases, 2013

Supreme Court of the United Kingdom cases
Judgments of the Supreme Court of the United Kingdom
Supreme Court of the United Kingdom
United Kingdom law-related lists